Renáta Hiráková (born 27 May 1971 in Košice) is a Slovak former basketball player who competed in the 1992 Summer Olympics and in the 2000 Summer Olympics.

References

1971 births
Living people
Slovak women's basketball players
Czechoslovak women's basketball players
Olympic basketball players of Czechoslovakia
Olympic basketball players of Slovakia
Basketball players at the 1992 Summer Olympics
Basketball players at the 2000 Summer Olympics
Sportspeople from Košice